The 1929 Western Kentucky State Normal Hilltoppers football team represented Western Kentucky State Normal School and Teachers College (now known as Western Kentucky University) in the 1929 college football season.  They were coached by Carl Anderson in his first season.

Schedule

References

Western Kentucky State Normal
Western Kentucky Hilltoppers football seasons
Western Kentucky State Normal Hilltoppers football